Edson Secco (1976, São Paulo, Brazil) is a Brazilian composer, musician and sound designer.

Biography 
He began his professional career in the late 90s as music producer and sound engineer. In the early 2000s he began producing soundtrack for plays. In 2005 he joined the Dry Opera Company, directed by Gerald Thomas, being responsible for the composition, sound design and live execution of several theatrical soundtracks.

In 2006 he started his film career with the documentary Days in Sintra as composer, sound editor and sound re-recording mixer.

His work on the film industry earned him two nominations for The 3rd Platino Award For Iberoamerican Cinema (2016), and the Academy of Motion Picture Arts and Sciences of Argentina (2015), respectively, as well as three prizes of Best Sound Design at the Brazilia Film Festival (2010 and 2013) and Gramado Festival (2013).

He is best known for his work with directors Walter Salles, Eryk Rocha, Petra Costa and Daniela Thomas.

As a musician he is part of the Brazilian electronic duo NU (abbreviation for Naked Universe), alongside the singer and songwriter Ligiana Costa.

Filmography

As composer 
 2008: Days in Sintra / Diário de Sintra (dir. Paula Gaitán)
 2008: Terras (dir. Maya Da-Rin)
 2009: Undertow Eyes / Olhos de Ressaca (dir. Petra Costa)
 2011: O Enigma do HU (dir. Pedro Urano e Joana Traub Cseko)
 2011: Paralelo 10  (dir. Silvio Da-Rin)
 2012: Elena  (dir. Petra Costa)
 2013: Pinta  (dir. Jorge Alencar)
 2013: Éden  (dir. Bruno Sáfadi)
 2013: After the Rain / Depois da Chuva (dir. Cláudio Marques e Marília Huges)
 2013: Venice 70: Future Reload  (dir. Walter Salles)
 2014: Hannya  (dir. Diogo Hayashi)
 2014: Com os Punhos Cerrados (dir. Pedro Diógenes, Luis Pretti e Ricardo Pretti)
 2014: Lygia Clark in Nova York (dir. Daniela Thomas)
 2015: 5 Vezes Chico, O Velho e sua Gente  (dir. Eduardo Nunes, Camilo Cavalcanti, Eduardo Goldenstein, Ana Rieper, Gustavo Spolidoro)
 2016: The City of The Future / A Cidade do Futuro (dir. Cláudio Marques e Marília Huges)
 2016: Amores Líquidos  (dir. Jorane Castro)
 2016: Maresia  (dir. Marcos Guttmann)
 2016: Two Irenes / As Duas Irenes  (dir. Fábio Meira)
 2017: Los Territorios  (dir. Ivan Granovsky)
 2017: Sultry / Mormaço  (dir. Marina Meliande)
 2017: A Terra Treme  (dir. Walter Salles)
 2018: Guerra de Algodão  (dir. Cláudio Marques e Marília Huges)
 2018: Elegia de Um Crime  (dir. Cristiano Burlan)
 2018: Babel SP (Série)  (dir. André Amparo)
 2018: Ser O Que Se É  (dir. Marcela Lordy)
 2018: Parque Oeste  (dir. Fabiana Assis)
 2018: O Pequeno Mal  (dir. Lucas Camargo de Barros e Nicolás Zetune)
 2018: Vozes de Paracatú e Bento (dir. Walter Salles)
 2019: Niède (dir. Tiago Tambelli)

As sound designer and/or re-recording mixer 
 2008: Diário de Sintra (dir. Paula Gaitán)
 2008: Terras (dir. Maya Da-Rin)
 2009: Undertow Eyes / Olhos de Ressaca (dir. Petra Costa)
 2010: Vale dos Esquecidos (dir. Maria Raduan)
 2010: Transeunte (dir. Eryk Rocha)
 2010: O Plantador de Quiabos (dir. Coletivo Santa Madeira) 
 2010: Náufragos (dir. Matheus Rocha e Gabriela Amaral)
 2010: Exercice du Regarde (dir. Thaís de Almeida Prado e Edson Secco)
 2011: O Enigma do HU (dir. Pedro Urano e Joana Traub Cseko)
 2011: Paralelo 10 (dir. Silvio Da-Rin)
 2011: Passagens (dir. Thaís de Almeida Prado)
 2012: Jards (dir. Eryk Rocha)
 2012: Os Barcos (dir. Caetano Gotardo e Thaís de Almeida Prado)
 2012: Elena (dir. Petra Costa)
 2013: Pinta  (dir. Jorge Alencar)
 2013: Éden  (dir. Bruno Sáfadi)
 2013: O Uivo da Gáita  (dir. Bruno Sáfadi)
 2013: After the Rain / Depois da Chuva (dir. Cláudio Marques e Marília Huges)
 2013: Venice 70: Future Reload
 2013: Exilados do Vulcão  (dir. Paula Gaitán)
 2014: Hannya (dir. Diogo Hayashi)
 2014: Dominguinhos (dir. Mariana Aydar, Eduardo Nazarian, Joaquim Castro)
 2014: Com os Punhos Cerrados (dir. Ricardo Pretti, Luiz Pretti, Pedro Diógenes)
 2014: Lygia Clark in Nova York (dir. Daniela Thomas)
 2014: O Fim de Uma Era (dir. Bruno Safadi, Ricardo Pretti)
 2015: Tropykaos (dir. Daniel Lisboa)
 2015: El Aula Vacía (dir. Lucrecia Martel, Flávia Castro, Mariana Chenillo, MAIS...)
 2015: Paulina (dir. Santiago Mitre)
 2015: O Prefeito (dir. Bruno Safadi)
 2015: Boi Neon (dir. Gabriel Mascaro)
 2015: 5 Vezes Chico, O Velho e sua Gente (dir. Ana Rieper, Eduardo Nunes, Gustavo Spolidoro, Camilo Cavalcante, Eduardo Goldenstein)
 2015: Futuro de Junho (dir. Maria Ramos)
 2016: Cinema Novo (dir. Eryk Rocha)
 2016: The City of The Future / A Cidade do Futuro (dir. Cláudio Marques e Marília Huges)
 2016: Entre Idas e Vindas (dir. José Eduardo Belmonte)
 2016: Pedro Osmar: A Liberdade que se Conquista (dir. Rodrigo T. Marques, Eduardo Consinni)
 2016: Amores Líquidos (dir. Jorane Castro)
 2016: Malícia (dir. Jimi Figueiredo)
 2017: Los Territorios (dir. Iván Granovsky)
 2017: Strasbourg
 2017: Invisible (dir. Pablo Giorgelli)
 2017: Sultry / Mormaço (dir. Mariana Meliande)
 2017: A Terra Treme (dir. Walter Salles)
 2018: Elegia de Um Crime (dir. Cristiano Burlan)
 2018: Luna (dir. Cris Azzi)
 2018: Babel SP (Série, dir. André Amparo)
 2018: Ser O Que Se É (dir. Marcela Lordy)
 2018: Parque Oeste (dir. Fabiana Assis)
 2018: O Pequeno Mal (dir. Lucas Camargo de Barros e Nicolas Thomé Zetune)
 2018: Vozes de Paracatú e Bento (dir. Walter Salles)
 2018: Deslembro (dir. Flávia Castro)
 2018: A Cidade No Brasil (Série)
 2019: Elas No Singular (Série)
 2019: Tantas Almas (dir. Nicolás Rincón Gille)
 2019: Miragem (dir. Eryk Rocha)
 2019: Niède (dir. Tiago Tambelli)

Discography

Studio albums 

Plástico Bolha, 2004, SONIDERIA
Asfaltaram a Terra, 2006, SONIDERIA
Rainha Mentira, 2007, SONIDERIA
Waste in Music, 2007, SONIDERIA
Diário de Sintra, 2007, SONIDERIA
Floresta Fantástica, 2008, SONIDERIA
Terras, 2009, SONIDERIA
Corrosivo, 2010, SONIDERIA
O Ovo e a Galinha 2010, SONIDERIA
Noisy Jam, 2010, SONIDERIA
Anger, 2011, SONIDERIA
Passagens, 2011, SONIDERIA
Licht + Licht, 2012, SONIDERIA
Brincar de Pensar, 2012, SONIDERIA
Paralelo 10, 2012, SONIDERIA
Nijinsky, Casamento com Deus, 2012, SONIDERIA
Remote Heart, 2012, SONIDERIA
5x Chico, 2015, SONIDERIA
NU (Naked Universe), 2015, Tratore
As Duas Irenes, 2016, SONIDERIA
A Dor, 2016, SONIDERIA
Secas, 2016, SONIDERIA
Pulso, 2016, SONIDERIA
ZÉ (Single), 2017, Tratore / SONIDERIA
So, I looked for you in every memory, 2019, SONIDERIA
Rô-bots, 2019, SONIDERIA

Theater

As composer and sound designer 
2005
 A Circus of Kidneys and Livers (Um Circo de Rins e Fígados) - starring Marco Nanini - Brazil and Argentina
2006
 Earth in Trance (Terra em Trânsito) - São Paulo/Brazil and La MaMa E.T.C., NYC
 Asphalt over a Kiss (Asfaltaram o Beijo) - São Paulo/Brazil
 A Cube of Ice in Flames (Um Bloco de Gelo em Chamas) - São Paulo/Brazil
 Ashes in the Freezer (Brasas no Congelador) - São Paulo/Brazil
2007
 Queen Liar (Rainha Mentira) - Brazil and Argentina
 Luartrovado - a funk opera adapted from Arnold Schoenberg's "Pierrot Lunaire" SESC Pinheiros June 2007
 Breve Interrupção - performed at Satyrianas 2007, produced by Cia. de Teatro Os Satyros.
2008
 Blog Soup Opera: "O Cão que Insultava as Mulheres, Kepler, The Dog!" - with: Fabiana Gugli - Additional Music 
2009
 Olhares entre Caldeiras - São Paulo/Brazil
2010
 Chaux (Les Chemins du Sel) - Arc-et-Senans/France
 O Ovo e a Galinha - São Paulo/Brazil
2011
 Remote Project - Barcelona/Spain
2012
 Nijinsky, Marriage with God - São Paulo/Brazil
2014
 Brincar de Pensar - São Paulo/Brazil
 RÓZA - São Paulo/Brazil
2016
 Pulso - São Paulo/Brazil
 A Dor - São Paulo/Brazil

Dance

As composer, sound designer, performer 
2006
 Waste In Process I - Rio de Janeiro/Brazil
2007
 Waste In Process II - Stockholm/Sweden
2008
 Waste In Process III - São Paulo/Brazil
2012
 Remote Project - New York City/USA

Exhibitions

As composer and sound designer 
2007
 Imagem da Imagem - Instituto Itaú Cultural / São Paulo / Brasil
2008
 H2Olhos - Instituto Itaú Cultural / São Paulo / Brasil
2010
 Ocupação Rogério Sganzerla - Instituto Itaú Cultural / São Paulo / Brasil

2011 
 Stuffinablank - Noises In The Void / Barcelona / Espanha
2014
 Here. Now. Where? - 5th Biennale of Marrakech / Marrocos

 Ocupação Zuzu Angel- Instituto Itaú Cultural / São Paulo / Brasil
2016
 Santos Dumont na Coleção Brasiliana Itaú -  Instituto Itaú Cultural / São Paulo / Brasil

Awards

References

External links 
 Edson Secco no Internet Movie Database

Edson Secco on Spotify

Edson Secco on Deezer

Edson Secco on Apple Store

Edson Secco on Google Play

Edson Secco on Tratore

SONIDERIA Site Oficial

Brazilian composers
Sound designers
Brazilian electronic musicians
1976 births
Living people